Saturday Morning All Star Hits! (S.M.A.S.H.!) is an American adult animated streaming television series that first aired on December 10, 2021. Directed by Dave McCary and Ben Jones, the show stars Kyle Mooney. Produced by Universal Television, the show was made as a mix of live-action with animation in conjunction with Ben Jones Studio, Inc., and Bento Box Entertainment for the animated segments, and Broadway Video for the live-action segments, and is a parody of Saturday-morning cartoon programming blocks from the 1980s and early 1990s, with a mix of animated and live-action content. It has received mostly positive reviews from critics.

Plot
The show is a parody of Saturday-morning cartoons from the 1980s and early 1990s, such as Chip and Pepper's Cartoon Madness, Fox Kids, and The Disney Afternoon, framed by an eponymous show called S.M.A.S.H.! for short. It is hosted by twin brothers Skip and Treybor (parodies of Chip and Pepper), both played by Kyle Mooney. They introduce various cartoon shows and have brief conversations between shows. The cartoons include:
Randy, a show about a dinosaur that befriends a group of teenagers. Randy falls into depression and alcoholism following a breakup with his firefighter girlfriend, before heading to music college. Randy is a spoof of Denver, the Last Dinosaur.
The Create-A-Crittles, a show about four magical creatures secretly living in the backyard shed of a yuppie graphic designer and his wife. Crittle Glitter, a euphemism for cocaine, is prominently featured throughout the show. Create-A-Crittles parodies such shows as Care Bears, Alvin and the Chipmunks and Popples.
Pro Bros, a show created by Ethan Rash who is known as the less prominent brother of controversial movie star/singer Johnny Rash, parodying ProStars and other series where pro athletes play themselves (albeit the pilot premiering in prime time as opposed to Saturday morning). The show's antagonist "Ronnie $elfish" and his drug habit are an allegory for Ethan's brother Johnny.
Strongimals, a show loosely parodying Thundercats, Teenage Mutant Ninja Turtles and other action cartoons of the era. The show is later retitled as Skip and the Strongimals, radically shifting its focus to Skip and his "uh... subs?" catchphrase as a result of Skip's rise to greater fame (which in itself is a reference to show The Real Ghostbusters and its eventual focus on the popular character Slimer).
Lil' Bruce, an animated comedy about comedian Bruce Chandling's "crazy childhood" similar to Howie Mandel's Bobby's World. The series ends up a failed pilot due to live-action Bruce's excessive narration and a too-heavy plotline about Bruce's father leaving him and his mother when he was young.
All Cartoon Stars Say Don't Say Shut Up, a public service announcement in the format of Cartoon All-Stars to the Rescue warning against the consequences of saying "shut up" to one's elders. Guest stars include "President of the Country" Barbara Barone (loosely based on Hillary Clinton and Tipper Gore, particularly their advocacy campaigns for media censorship) and famous pop singer Nuance (based on Paula Abdul).
Slingers, a toy-based show parodying the animated pilot The Legend of the Hawaiian Slammers.
 Others include brief clips from The Meeps (satirizing The Smurfs), Crittle Littles (satirizing Muppet Babies and Kingdom Chums), the character Puppy the Dog (satirizing classic cartoons), Dr. Von Duck (satirizing DuckTales), Egyptian Jazz Cats (satirizing music-band cartoons such as Josie and the Pussycats), Lottie (a live-action teen sitcom satirizing Blossom) and Intimate Compromise: Casino Nights Seductions an R-rated live-action film parodying such films as Basic Instinct, True Lies and L.A. Confidential and its animated counterpart Intimate Compromise: Casino Nights Seductions: The Animated Series (which satirizes the process of turning R-rated movies into cartoons such as Robocop, Rambo: The Force of Freedom, Toxic Crusaders, Police Academy and Conan the Adventurer) as seen with numerous clips from home movies, news shows and commercials promoting Nextronico's Mega Mitten (spoofing Nintendo's infamous Power Glove), Rude Cubes (Madballs), Sonic Yum gum (spoofing Bubble Yum and "For You, Not Them" Bubble Tape ads), diet sodas, sneakers and submarine sandwiches.  
Sometime after S1:E6, Treybor quits S.M.A.S.H.! because he feels overshadowed by his twin brother Skip. In the season finale, Treybor confronts Skip during a live broadcast to vent his frustrations, before their mother shows up and urges them to reconcile while introducing them to their long-lost triplet brother, Corbee (Nathan Fielder). Skip leaves S.M.A.S.H.!, after which all three triplets become VJs on Monday Early Afternoon Rock Song Hits, which shows skludge rock (grunge rock) music videos geared towards older teenagers and young adults.

Starting in S1:E4, breaking news interruptions chronicle the disappearance of Lottie co-stars Lottie Wolfe and Sean Benjamin and the subsequent police investigation; Wolfe's boyfriend and fellow teen sensation Johnny Rash is initially arrested and tried for their presumed deaths (in a nationally televised trial a la O.J. Simpson), during which Benjamin's body is found, but a jury acquits Rash due to matching left-and-right shoeprints being found at the scene, contradicting Rash's fashion statement of always wearing mismatched shoes (reminiscent of the backwards clothes worn by Kris Kross). Though it proved futile in court, evidence against Rash was found by a 9-year-old S.M.A.S.H.! superfan named Katherine Logan (implied to be the one who is switching tapes of S.M.A.S.H.! off-screen), who spotted a blooper in the Skip and the Strongimals Movie in which an unidentified figure (thought to be Johnny Rash himself) threw an athletic shoe matching the crime scene into the D'ahai Sea.

Running gags include the names of animation studios GIK (a play on DIC Entertainment), Herb Whibley (Walt Disney), and Polystar (a spoof of Carolco), numerous appearances of sub sandwiches and catchphrases like "zuzzy zazz" and "uh... subs?".

Cast
 Kyle Mooney as Skip and Treybor, Bruce Chandling, Randy on Randy, Brusho on Create-A-Crittles, various other characters
 Eric Bauza as Tigor on Strongimals and Pasto on Create-A-Crittles
 Geraldine Viswanathan as Lottie Wolfe
 Emma Stone as Heather on Randy
 Pamela Adlon as Digit on Randy, Argie B. on Create-A-Crittles, various other characters
 Cree Summer as Scizzi and Ruth on Create-A-Crittles, Rhonda on Skip and the Strongimals, various other characters
 Dylan Sprouse as Sean Benjamin
 Beck Bennett as Thomas on Randy and various other characters
 Maurice LaMarche as various characters
 Chris Redd as Denny Jones on Pro Bros
 Paul Rudd as David on Create-A-Crittles
 Ben Jones
 Scott Gairdner
 Grey Griffin
 Fred Armisen as Rye Henders on Pro Bros
 Kate Lyn Sheil
 Carlos Alazraqui as JJ Henders on ProBros, Papa Meep on The Meeps, various other characters
 Kevin Michael Richardson as Vulgaris on Cartoon All Stars Say Don't Say Shut Up and Mo Jones on Pro Bros
 Frank Welker as Ronnie $elfish on Pro Bros
Rae Dawn Chong
Nathan Fielder as Corbee
 Amy Grabow
Lela Brown as Nuance
Kristin Lindquist as President of the Country Barbara Barone
Taharka Welcome as DJ Swish

Episodes

Production
The show was co-created by Mooney (who plays both Skip and Treybor), director Dave McCary (directing the live action segments), and animator Ben Jones, best known for his work on the Cartoon Network series The Problem Solverz and the FXX animated series Stone Quackers, and the Emmy Award-winning sitcom Bob's Burgers. It is produced by Saturday Night Live creator Lorne Michaels.

Reception
Saturday Morning All Star Hits! has received mostly positive reviews from critics.

See also
Animation in the United States in the television era

References

External links
 
 

2020s American adult animated television series
2020s American animated comedy television series
2020s American parody television series
2020s American sketch comedy television series
2020s American variety television series
2020s American surreal comedy television series
2021 American television series debuts
2021 American television series endings
American adult animated comedy television series
American television series with live action and animation
American animated variety television series
Animated television series by Netflix
English-language Netflix original programming
Fictional television shows
Metafictional television series
Television series about television
Television series created by Ben Jones
Television series by Universal Television
Television series set in the 1980s
Television series set in the 1990s